Below is a list of Rusyn language exonyms for towns and villages in the Vojvodina region of Serbia (Rusyn names are in parentheses).

A
Ada (Ада)
Alibunar (Алибунар)
Apatin (Апатин)

B
Bač (Бач)
Bačinci (Бачинци)
Bačka Palanka (Бачка Паланка)
Bačka Topola (Бачка Тополя)
Bački Gračac (Бачки Ґрачац, Филїпово)
Bački Jarak (Бачки Ярак)
Bački Petrovac (Бачки Петровец)
Bačko Gradište (Бачке Ґрадиште)
Bajmok (Баймок)
Batajnica (Батайница)
Bečej (Бечей)
Begeč (Беґеч)
Bela Crkva (Била Церква)
Beočin (Беочин)
Berkasovo (Беркасово)
Beška (Бешка)
Bikić Do (Бикич Дол, Бикич)

C
Crepaja (Црепая)
Crvena Crkva (Червена Церква)
Crvenka (Червинка)

Č
Čelarevo (Челарево)
Čoka (Чока)
Čonoplja (Чонопля)
Čurug (Чуроґ)

D
Debeljača (Дебеляча)
Deronje (Деронє, Диронь)
Divoš (Дивош)
Dolovo (Долово)
Doroslovo (Дорослово)

Đ
Đurđevo (Дюрдьов)

E
Ečka (Ечка)

F
Feketić (Фекетич)
Futog (Футоґ)

G
Glogonj (Ґлоґань, Ґлоґонь)
Gornji Breg (Горнї Брег)
Gospođinci (Ґосподїнци)
Grabovci (Ґрабовица)
Gunaroš (Ґунарош)

H
Hajdučica (Хайдучица)
Horgoš (Горґош)

I
Idvor (Идвор)
Iđoš (Идьош)
Inđija (Индїя)
Irig (Ириґ)

J
Jabuka (Ябука)
Jamena (Ямена)
Jankov Most (Янков Мост)

K
Kačarevo (Качарево)
Kać (Кать)
Kanjiža (Канїжа)
Kelebija (Келебия)
Kikinda (Кикинда)
Kisač (Кисач)
Kljajićevo (Кляїчево)
Kovačica (Ковачица)
Kovilj (Ковиль)
Kovin (Ковин)
Krčedin (Крчедин)
Kruščić (Крущич, Вепровач)
Kucura (Коцур)
Kukujevci (Кукуєвци)
Kula (Кула)
Kulpin (Кулпин)
Kumane (Кумане)
Kuzmin (Кузмин)

L
Laćarak (Латярак)
Lalić (Лалить)
Lazarevo (Лазарево)
Lokve (Локве)
Lovćenac (Ловченац)

M
Mačvanska Mitrovica (Мачванска Митровица)
Maglić (Маґлич)
Mali Iđoš (Мали Идьош)
Martinci (Мартинци)
Martonoš (Мартонош)
Melenci (Меленци)
Miletićevo (Милетичево)
Mol (Мол)
Morović (Морович)
Mošorin (Мошорин)
Mramorak (Мраморак)

N
Nakovo (Наково)
Neradin (Нерадин)
Neuzina (Неузина)
Noćaj (Ночай)
Nova Crnja (Нова Црня)
Nova Pazova (Нова Пазова)
Novi Bečej (Нови Бечей)
Novi Kneževac (Нови Кнежевац)
Novi Sad (Нови Сад)
Novo Miloševo (Нове Милошево)
Novo Orahovo (Нове Орахово)

O
Odžaci (Оджак)
Omoljica (Омолїца)
Opovo (Опово)
Orom (Ором)

P
Pačir (Пачир)
Padej (Падей)
Palić (Палич)
Pančevo (Панчево)
Pavliš (Павлиш)
Pećinci (Печинци)
Perlez (Перлез)
Petrovaradin (Петроварадин)
Plandište (Пландиште)
Popinci (Попинци)
Prigrevica (Приґревица)
Putnikovo (Путниково)

R
Ravno Selo (Равне Село, Шове)
Ruma (Рума)
Rumenka (Руменка)
Ruski Krstur (Руски Керестур)

S
Sajan (Саян)
Sakule (Сакуле)
Samoš (Самош)
Savino Selo (Савине Село, Торжа)
Sečanj (Сечань)
Selenča (Селенча)
Seleuš (Селеуш)
Senta (Сента)
Silbaš (Силбаш)
Sivac (Сивец)
Skorenovac (Скореновац)
Sombor (Зомбор)
Sonta (Сонта)
Srbobran (Србобран)
Sremska Kamenica (Сримска Каменїца)
Sremska Mitrovica (Сримска Митровица)
Sremski Karlovci (Сримски Карловци)
Srpska Crnja (Сербска Црня)
Stara Moravica (Стара Моравица)
Stara Pazova (Стара Пазова)
Starčevo (Старчево)
Stari Banovci (Стари Бановци)
Subotica (Суботица)
Subotište (Суботиште)
Sutjeska (Сут'єска)
Svetozar Miletić (Светозар Милетич)

Š
Šid (Шид)
Šimanovci (Шимановци)

T
Telečka (Телечка)
Temerin (Темерин)
Titel (Титель)
Tomaševac (Томашевац)
Torak (Торак)
Torda (Торда)
Tornjoš (Торньош)
Turija (Турия)

V
Veliko Središte (Вельке Средиште)
Veternik (Ветерник)
Vojka (Войка)
Vrbas (Вербас)
Vršac (Вершец)

Z
Zrenjanin (Зренянин)

Ž
Žabalj (Жабель)
Žarkovo (Жарково)
Žitište (Житиште)

See also
List of European exonyms
List of cities, towns and villages in Vojvodina

Rusyn diaspora
Rusyn
Rusyn